Nicolas Mahut was the defending champion, but lost to Dustin Brown in the second round.
Michaël Llodra won the title after defeating Arnaud Clément 7–5, 6–1 in the final.

Seeds

Draw

Finals

Top half

Bottom half

References
 Main draw
 Qualifying draw

Singles